The Men's pole vault event at the 2013 European Athletics Indoor Championships was held on March 2, 2013 at 11:00 & 13:30 (qualification) and March 3, 16:33 (final) local time.

Records

Results

Qualification
Qualification: Qualification Performance 5.75 (Q) or at least 8 best performers advanced to the final.

Final
The final was held at 16:33.

References

Pole vault at the European Athletics Indoor Championships
2013 European Athletics Indoor Championships